"Heaven in My Hands" is a 1988 song by the British group Level 42.

It was released as the first single from the band's album Staring at the Sun, and reached number 12 in the UK charts. It was the first Level 42 single not to feature the Gould brothers, Boon and Phil, following their departure from the band the previous year. However, Boon Gould did write the song's lyric.

The instrumental introduction, heard on the extended 12" single version of the song, was heavily used by BBC Sport early in their coverage of the 1989 Wimbledon Championships. The music was also adapted for the Croatian and Slovak versions of the hit television game show Wheel of Fortune.

Personnel
Mark King - Bass / Vocals
Mike Lindup - Keyboards / Vocals
Gary Husband - Drums
Alan Murphy - Guitars
Wally Badarou - Keyboards
Dominic Miller - Guitars
Steve Sidwell - Trumpets

Track Listing
 7" Version - 4:08
 Extended Version - 7:20
 Remix - 7:10
 Guitarpella Mix - 5:47
 Album Version - 4:41
 LP Version - 5:27

Charts

References

1988 singles
Level 42 songs
Songs written by Boon Gould
Songs written by Mark King (musician)
1988 songs
Polydor Records singles